State Route 17 (SR 17) is a secondary state highway entirely within Chattanooga, Hamilton County, Tennessee.

Route description
SR 17 begins at Georgia State Route 193 (SR 193) at the Tennessee-Georgia State line in the city of Chattanooga's historic Saint Elmo neighborhood. It meets, and briefly merges with SR 58. It then continues north to US 11/US 41/US 64/US 72 where in begins a  concurrency with US 11/US 64 and a  concurrency with US 41.

Just past the US 11/US 41/US 64/US 72 junction, SR 17 intersects with Interstate 24 (I-24). It then continues northward to where US 11 and US 64 turn west onto East 20th Street and US 41/US 72/SR 17 continue north along Broad Street. At intersection US 72 continues northward while US 41/SR 17 and US 76 turn eastward onto West Main Street. Here SR 17 begins a concurrency with US 76.

The three routes continue eastward along West Main Street to South Willow Street where SR 17 turns north on the aforementioned street and US 41/US 76 continues eastward. It then proceeds northward through the neighborhoods of west-central and north-west Chattanooga before coming to an end at SR 58/SR 153/SR 317.

Major intersections

References

Chattanooga, Tennessee
017
Transportation in Hamilton County, Tennessee